Poliana Barbosa Medeiros (born 6 February 1991), known as Poliana, is a Brazilian football defender who plays for Campeonato Brasileiro de Futebol Feminino side São José and the Brazil women's national football team.

Club career

Poliana signed for Santos in 2009 after a successful trial period. After moving on to São José, Poliana won the Copa Libertadores Femenina three times in 2011, 2013 and 2014. She scored two goals in the 2014 final.

In December 2014, Poliana played for São José in the 2014 International Women's Club Championship, which they won by thrashing English wild-card entrant Arsenal Ladies 2–0 in the final. Later that month, she agreed a transfer to the United States, with National Women's Soccer League (NWSL) team Houston Dash.

Before Poliana could play for Houston, she was included in an 18-month residency programme intended to prepare Brazil's national team for the 2015 FIFA Women's World Cup in Canada and the 2016 Rio Olympics.

In July 2015, Poliana agreed to play for Icelandic Úrvalsdeild club Stjarnan in their UEFA Women's Champions League qualifiers the following month.

On 6 February 2018, Poliana was traded by the Dash to the Orlando Pride for a second-round pick in the 2019 NWSL College Draft. She was waived at the end of the season having made 10 appearances.

International career

After representing Brazil at the 2010 edition of the FIFA U-20 Women's World Cup, Poliana made her senior debut at the 2012 Torneio Internacional Cidade de São Paulo de Futebol Feminino.

Poliana was not included in Brazil's initial squad for the 2019 FIFA Women's World Cup, but received a late call-up when Fabiana withdrew with a thigh injury.

International goals

References

External links

 
 Poliana Barbosa Medeiros – FIFA World Cup profile
 Houston Dash player profile

1991 births
Living people
Brazilian women's footballers
Brazilian expatriate footballers
Brazil women's international footballers
Houston Dash players
Brazilian expatriate sportspeople in the United States
Expatriate women's soccer players in the United States
2015 FIFA Women's World Cup players
Footballers at the 2016 Summer Olympics
Sportspeople from Minas Gerais
Women's association football defenders
National Women's Soccer League players
Expatriate women's footballers in Iceland
Olympic footballers of Brazil
São José Esporte Clube (women) players
Stjarnan women's football players
Úrvalsdeild kvenna (football) players
Orlando Pride players
Brazilian expatriate sportspeople in Iceland
2019 FIFA Women's World Cup players
Pan American Games medalists in football
Pan American Games gold medalists for Brazil
Footballers at the 2015 Pan American Games
Medalists at the 2015 Pan American Games
Footballers at the 2020 Summer Olympics